The 1969 CFL season is considered to be the 16th season in modern-day Canadian football, although it was officially the 12th Canadian Football League season.

CFL News in 1969
The 1969 Grey Cup game started play on a Sunday for the first time in CFL history; all Grey Cup games since (except for 1970) have been played on a Sunday. (The CFL did play a Grey Cup game on Sunday before, in 1962, when the original Saturday Grey Cup game was delayed due to heavy fog that caused the final 9 minutes and 28 seconds to be played the following day.)

The Grey Cup was held in Montreal, Quebec for the first time since 1931.

A new logo was introduced to the league on November 26, four days before that year's Grey Cup game: A white helmet with a one-bar face mask with a maple leaf in the centre and the word CFL in white in the maple leaf. It replaced the leaf/football/ribbon logo used since the league's formation in 1958, and would be used until 2002.

Records: The Rough Riders' Margene Adkins set the record for average gain per pass in a season with 25.0 yards. The record stood for 28 years, until Milt Stegall broke it.

Regular season standings

Final regular season standings
Note: GP = Games Played, W = Wins, L = Losses, T = Ties, PF = Points For, PA = Points Against, Pts = Points

Bold text means that they have clinched the playoffs.
Saskatchewan and Ottawa have first round byes.

Grey Cup playoffs
Note: All dates in 1969

Conference Semi-Finals

Conference Finals

Playoff bracket

Grey Cup Championship

CFL Leaders
 CFL Passing Leaders
 CFL Rushing Leaders
 CFL Receiving Leaders

1969 CFL All-Stars

Offence
QB – Russ Jackson, Ottawa Rough Riders
RB – George Reed, Saskatchewan Roughriders
RB – Vic Washington, Ottawa Rough Riders
RB – Dave Raimey, Toronto Argonauts
TE – Herman Harrison, Calgary Stampeders
SE – Margene Adkins, Ottawa Rough Riders
F – Ken Nielsen, Winnipeg Blue Bombers
C – Ted Urness, Saskatchewan Roughriders
OG – Jack Abendschan, Saskatchewan Roughriders
OG – Charlie Bray, Toronto Argonauts
OT – Clyde Brock, Saskatchewan Roughriders
OT – Ellison Kelly, Hamilton Tiger-Cats

Defence
DT – John LaGrone, Edmonton Eskimos
DT – Ed McQuarters, Saskatchewan Roughriders
DE – Billy Joe Booth, Ottawa Rough Riders
DE – Ed Harrington, Toronto Argonauts
LB – Ken Lehmann, Ottawa Rough Riders
LB – Jerry "Soupy" Campbell, Ottawa Rough Riders
LB – Phil Minnick, Winnipeg Blue Bombers
DB – John Wydarney, Edmonton Eskimos
DB – Marv Luster, Toronto Argonauts
DB – Bruce Bennett, Saskatchewan Roughriders
DB – Don Sutherin, Ottawa Rough Riders
DB – Garney Henley, Hamilton Tiger-Cats
DB – Larry Fairholm, Montreal Alouettes

1969 Eastern All-Stars

Offence
QB – Russ Jackson, Ottawa Rough Riders
RB – Dennis Duncan, Montreal Alouettes
RB – Vic Washington, Ottawa Rough Riders
RB – Dave Raimey, Toronto Argonauts
TE – Mel Profit, Toronto Argonauts
SE – Margene Adkins, Ottawa Rough Riders
F – Bobby Taylor, Toronto Argonauts
C – Basil Bark, Montreal Alouettes
OG – Charlie Parker, Montreal Alouettes
OG – Charlie Bray, Toronto Argonauts
OT – Danny Nykoluk, Toronto Argonauts
OT – Ellison Kelly, Hamilton Tiger-Cats

Defence
DT – John Barrow, Hamilton Tiger-Cats
DT – Marshall Shirk, Ottawa Rough Riders
DE – Billy Joe Booth, Ottawa Rough Riders
DE – Ed Harrington, Toronto Argonauts
LB – Ken Lehmann, Ottawa Rough Riders
LB – Jerry "Soupy" Campbell, Ottawa Rough Riders
LB – Henry Sorrell, Hamilton Tiger-Cats
DB – Ed Learn, Toronto Argonauts
DB – Marv Luster, Toronto Argonauts
DB – Dick Thornton, Toronto Argonauts
DB – Don Sutherin, Ottawa Rough Riders
DB – Garney Henley, Hamilton Tiger-Cats

1969 Western All-Stars

Offence
QB – Ron Lancaster, Saskatchewan Roughriders
RB – George Reed, Saskatchewan Roughriders
RB – Jim Evenson, BC Lions
RB – Jim Young, BC Lions
TE – Herman Harrison, Calgary Stampeders
SE – Terry Evanshen, Calgary Stampeders
F – Ken Nielsen, Winnipeg Blue Bombers
F – Hugh Campbell, Saskatchewan Roughriders
C – Ted Urness, Saskatchewan Roughriders
OG – Jack Abendschan, Saskatchewan Roughriders
OG – Ken Sugarman, BC Lions
OT – Clyde Brock, Saskatchewan Roughriders
OT – Lanny Boleski, Calgary Stampeders

Defence
DT – John LaGrone, Edmonton Eskimos
DT – Ed McQuarters, Saskatchewan Roughriders
DE – Bill Whisler, Winnipeg Blue Bombers
DE – John Helton, Calgary Stampeders
LB – Wayne Harris, Calgary Stampeders
LB – Wayne Shaw, Saskatchewan Roughriders
LB – Wally Dempsey, Saskatchewan Roughriders
DB – John Wydarney, Edmonton Eskimos
DB – Frank Andruski, Calgary Stampeders
DB – Bruce Bennett, Saskatchewan Roughriders
DB – Jerry Bradley, BC Lions
DB – Rich Robinson, BC Lions

1969 CFL Awards
CFL's Most Outstanding Player Award – Russ Jackson (QB), Ottawa Rough Riders
CFL's Most Outstanding Canadian Award – Russ Jackson (QB), Ottawa Rough Riders
CFL's Most Outstanding Lineman Award – John LaGrone (DT), Edmonton Eskimos
CFL's Coach of the Year – Frank Clair, Ottawa Rough Riders
 Jeff Russel Memorial Trophy (Eastern MVP) – Russ Jackson (QB), Ottawa Rough Riders
 Jeff Nicklin Memorial Trophy (Western MVP) - Ron Lancaster (QB), Saskatchewan Roughriders
 Gruen Trophy (Eastern Rookie of the Year) - Al Phaneuf (DB), Montreal Alouettes
 Dr. Beattie Martin Trophy (Western Rookie of the Year) - Dave Easley (DB), BC Lions
 DeMarco–Becket Memorial Trophy (Western Outstanding Lineman) - Ed McQuarters (DT), Saskatchewan Roughriders

References

CFL
Canadian Football League seasons